The 2018 Coupe Banque Nationale is a tennis tournament played on indoor carpet courts. It was the 26th edition of the Tournoi de Québec and part of the WTA International tournaments of the 2018 WTA Tour. It took place at the PEPS de l'Université Laval in Quebec City, Canada, from September 10 through September 16, 2018.

Points and prize money

Point distribution

Prize money

Singles main draw entrants

Seeds

1 Rankings are as of August 27, 2018

Other entrants
The following players received wildcards into the singles main draw:
  Françoise Abanda
  Leylah Annie Fernandez
  Rebecca Marino

The following player entered the singles main draw with a protected ranking:
  Olga Govortsova

The following players received entry from the qualifying draw:
  Marie Bouzková
  Gabriela Dabrowski
  Victoria Duval 
  Sesil Karatantcheva
  Tereza Martincová
  Jessica Pegula

Withdrawals
Before the tournament
  Anna Blinkova → replaced by  Veronika Kudermetova
  Danielle Collins → replaced by  Naomi Broady
  Olga Danilović → replaced by  Ons Jabeur
  Vitalia Diatchenko → replaced by  Madison Brengle
  Margarita Gasparyan → replaced by  Beatriz Haddad Maia
  Anastasia Pavlyuchenkova → replaced by  Heather Watson
  Peng Shuai → replaced by  Mona Barthel
  Sachia Vickery → replaced by  Georgina García Pérez

Doubles main draw entrants

Seeds

1 Rankings are as of August 20, 2018

Other entrants
The following pairs received wildcards into the doubles main draw:
 Leylah Annie Fernandez  /  Sharon Fichman
 Carson Branstine  /  Rebecca Marino

Champions

Singles

  Pauline Parmentier def.  Jessica Pegula 7–5, 6–2

Doubles

  Asia Muhammad /  Maria Sanchez def.  Darija Jurak /  Xenia Knoll 6–4, 6–3

References

External links
Official website

Coupe Banque Nationale
Tournoi de Québec
Coupe Banque Nationale
Coupe Banque Nationale
2010s in Quebec City